The 2019 Women's Under–21 Tri Nations Hockey Tournament was an invitational women's under–21 field hockey competition, hosted by Hockey Australia. The tournament took place between 3–8 December 2019 in Canberra, Australia. A total of three teams competed for the title.

India won the tournament, finishing top of the pool after the round-robin stage. Australia and New Zealand finished second and third, respectively.

Teams
Including Australia, 3 teams were invited by Hockey Australia to participate in the tournament.

  (host nation)

Results
All times are local (UTC+11:00).

Pool

Fixtures

Statistics

Final standings

Goalscorers

References

External links
Hockey Australia Official Website

2019 in women's field hockey
2019 in New Zealand women's sport
2019 in Australian women's field hockey
2019 in Japanese women's sport
International women's field hockey competitions hosted by Australia
December 2019 sports events in Oceania
Sports competitions in Canberra